The Klov Palace is the seat of the Supreme Court of Ukraine in Kyiv. The building takes its name from Klov, a neighbourhood of Pechersk District. 

The Baroque residence was constructed between 1752 and 1756 with funds provided by Kyiv Pechersk Lavra. The Russian royal family were expected to stay at the palace during their visits to the monastery, as they did in a wooden palace that had preceded it. The architects are thought to have been Gottfried Johann Schädel and Pyotr Neyelov. The actual construction was supervised by Stepan Kovnir. The main hall has the plafond frescoed in 1760. A formal garden was laid out around the palace.

The palace was never visited by any royalty, however, and it was not long before it fell into disrepair. Catherine II of Russia, who was passing through Kyiv in 1787, preferred Mariinskyi Palace for her residence. It was destroyed by a fire in 1858 and was rebuilt soon after with the addition of an upper story and the side wings. The palace burnt down in the aftermath of the Russian Revolution. A restoration process was undertaken in the 1970s.

Occupants of the palace
 The publishing house of the Kyiv Pechersk Monastery (1760s)
 A military hospital (1770–1811)
 First Kyiv Gymnasium (1811–1857)
 The diocesan school for girls (late 19th century)
 The Ukrainian Museum of the Great Patriotic War (1974–81)
 The Kyiv History Museum (1980s and 1990s)

References

External links
 
 The Supreme Court of Ukraine

Buildings and structures in Kyiv
Baroque palaces in Ukraine
Houses completed in 1756
Pecherskyi District
National supreme court buildings